Harry Peel may refer to:

 Harry Peel (footballer) (1900–1976), English footballer
 Harry Peel (ice hockey) (1879–1944), ice hockey player